Alan C. Pope High School is a public high school located north of Atlanta in Marietta, Georgia, within unincorporated Cobb County. The school was founded in 1987 and serves approximately 1,888 students in grades 9-12. The school mascot is the greyhound, and the school colors are Carolina blue, navy blue, and gray.

Extracurricular activities

Athletics

Pope's athletic teams are known as the Greyhounds (Lady Greyhounds for female teams).  Their athletic rivals include Walton and Lassiter high schools.

Pope is home of the eight-time girl's slow-pitch softball State Champions in 1999, 2000, 2001, 2002, 2003, 2005, 2006, and 2007; four-time AAAAA girls soccer State Champions in 1999, 2000, 2001, and 2002 seasons; AAAA girls track and field State Champions in 1995; and four-time AAAA girls cross country State Champions in 1994, 1995, 1996 and 1997. The Greyhounds also won the 2011 GHSA AAAA Traditional Wrestling Championship, the 2012 GHSA AAAA Dual and Traditional Wrestling Championships, the 2013 GHSA Dual and Traditional Wrestling AAAAA Championships, the 2014 AAAAA Dual Wrestling Championship, and the 2020 AAAAAA Dual Wrestling Championship.

Beginning with the fall 2012 academic year, Pope was reclassified as a AAAAAA (6A) school.

In 2009 Pope High School won the AAAAA Volleyball State Championship. The volleyball team went on to win the next two state titles in 2010 and 2011 in the AAAA classification.  Pope won the Georgia AAAA girls' basketball Championship in 1999.

The Greyhounds became the 1999 state AAAA boys cross country champions, 1999 boys' state swimming champions, and the 2009 and 2013 state AAAAA baseball champions. The Pope baseball team also won the 2017 & 2018 AAAAAA State Championship. In 2009 Pope's volleyball team won the state AAAAA championship, and in 2010 the volleyball team won the AAAA Championship. The Pope volleyball team also won the 2018 AAAAAA state championship. Pope was re-classed into 4A in 2010 due to enrollment numbers.

Pope offers the following sports:
 Baseball
 Basketball
 Cheerleading, spirit and competition
 Cross country
 Fast-pitch softball
 Football
 Golf
 Gymnastics
 Lacrosse
 Rugby
 Slow-pitch and fast-pitch softball
 Soccer
 Swimming and diving
 Tennis
 Track and field
 Volleyball
 Wrestling

Feeder schools
All or some students from the following schools eventually find their way to Pope High School due to local district boundaries.
 Dodgen Middle School
 Hightower Trail Middle School
 Mountain View Elementary School
 Murdock Elementary School
 Shallowford Falls Elementary School
 Timber Ridge Elementary School
 Tritt Elementary School

Notable alumni

 Kelly Barnhill, National Pro Fastpitch (NPF) professional fast-pitch softball pitcher
 Brandon Boggs, Major League Baseball (MLB) left fielder
 Shane Harris, journalist at The Washington Post and author
 Robert Lane Greene, journalist at The Economist and author
 Yassir Lester, comedian
 Josh Lowe, Major League Baseball (MLB) outfielder
 Nate Lowe, MLB first baseman
 Steve Wilkerson, MLB outfielder
 Duane Underwood Jr., MLB pitcher
 T. J. Yates, National Football League (NFL) quarterback
 Jackson Conway, Major League Soccer (MLS) striker for Atlanta United

References

External links
 

Educational institutions established in 1987
Public high schools in Georgia (U.S. state)
Schools in Cobb County, Georgia
1987 establishments in Georgia (U.S. state)